This page is an extended disambiguation page listing all educational institutions currently or formerly using the nickname Titans, evoking the class of deities that preceded the Olympians.

Non Scholastic Teams currently named Titans

Non Scholastic Teams formerly named Titans
 New York Titans, former name of the New York Jets, an American football team
 Trenton Titans, a defunct hockey team in the ECHL from Trenton, New Jersey
 New York/Orlando Titans, a defunct pro lacrosse team.

College Athletic Teams

High School Athletic Teams

British Columbia

Florida

Georgia

Idaho

Illinois

1 Hamilton High School and Warsaw High School operate a joint athletic program under the name of West Hancock Titans.

Indiana

Kansas

Kentucky

Maryland

Massachusetts

Michigan

Nevada

New Jersey

New York

New York City

North Carolina

Ohio

Oklahoma

Texas

Virginia

Middle School Athletic Teams
 Ottawa Middle School - Ottawa, Ohio
 South Gibson Jr. Titans - Fort Branch, Indiana1
 Traverse City West Middle School - Traverse City, Michigan

1 Combination of the South Gibson School Corporation's three middle schools.

See also

Athletic nickname
Australian national sports team nicknames
List of college sports team nicknames

References

Sports teams named Titans
Lists of sports teams
Nicknames in sports
Sports culture
Athletic culture based on Greek antiquity
Sport-related lists